The R826 road is a regional road in south Dublin, Ireland. The road runs from the Dundrum junction of the M50 (Junction 13) as passes through or near Ballinteer, Dundrum and Balally before terminating at the junction with the R112 close to Goatstown. The route runs on mostly new road, built to facilitate the M50 and Dundrum Town Center and is 2.5 km (1.5 miles) long.

Route 
 Starts at Junction 13 of the M50 on a roundabout that links with the R113 and R133 and heads in a southerly direction. The road is known as the Balinteer Road until another roundabout 750 M further where the Ballinteer Road continues to the West while the R826 continues south as the Wyckham Way.
 The Wyckham Way section of the road has Bus lanes running each direction and again links with the Ballinteer Road at a roundabout before the fourth and final roundabout on the route where the road links up the R117 and an entrance to the Dundrum Town Center.
 A short distance later is a signalised crossroads where the road intersects the Sandyford Road (R117 heading south, local road heading north). The road also crosses the Luas Green Line just beyond the junction and there is a turn for the Balally Luas Station car park.
 At this point the road is known as Overend Way as it passes beside Airfield. There is then another signaled junction where the road meets the Upper Kilmacud Road and passes on to Birches Lane. The route terminates at a T-junction with the R112 close to Goatstown.

See also
Roads in Ireland
National primary road
National secondary road

References
Roads Act 1993 (Classification of Regional Roads) Order 2006 – Department of Transport

Regional roads in the Republic of Ireland
Roads in County Dublin